DeAndre Kane (born June 10, 1989) is an American-born naturalized Hungarian professional basketball player who last played for Peristeri of the Greek Basket League and the BCL. He played college basketball at Marshall University and Iowa State University before playing professionally in Russia, Belgium, Germany, Israel, Spain and Serbia.

College career
A 6'5" shooting guard from Pittsburgh, Pennsylvania, Kane spent his first three collegiate seasons at Marshall University. After sitting out the 2009–10 season as a partial academic qualifier, Kane was named the Conference USA Freshman of the Year in 2010–11 after averaging 15.1 points and 3.4 assists per game. For the next two years, Kane was named to the All-conference second team. In 2011-12, he helped the Herd to the championship game in Conference USA, including setting a record of 40 points scored in a second-round, triple-overtime win over Tulsa, before the Herd fell to the Memphis Tigers at the FedEx Forum in Memphis under Coach Tom Herrion.

After graduating from Marshall, he was immediately eligible to play as a transfer at Iowa State. Kane was named to the midseason Wooden Award top 25 watch list for National Player of the Year. On February 13, he was named one of the 30 finalists for Naismith College Player of the Year. The Sporting News named him a third team All-American.

Professional career

2014–15 season
Despite impressive workouts and a solid college career, Kane went undrafted in the 2014 NBA draft. In July 2014, he joined the Los Angeles Lakers for the 2014 NBA Summer League. On September 11, 2014, he signed with Krasny Oktyabr of Russia for the 2014–15 season. On November 5, 2014, he was released by Krasny Oktyabr after appearing in just six games. On November 17, 2014, he signed with Antwerp Giants of Belgium for the rest of the season.

2015–16 season
In July 2015, Kane joined the Atlanta Hawks for the 2015 NBA Summer League. On July 30, he signed with ratiopharm Ulm of Germany for the 2015–16 season. On December 8, he parted ways with Ulm after appearing in eleven league games and eight EuroCup games. On January 2, 2016, he signed with the Israeli club Hapoel Eilat for the rest of the season.

2016–17 season
On July 26, 2016, Kane signed with Russian club Nizhny Novgorod for the 2016–17 season. On January 4, 2017, Kane recorded a career-high 31 points, shooting 13-of-16 from the field, along with nine rebounds and two assists in a 113–105 win over Zenit Saint Petersburg. On March 3, 2017, he parted ways with Nizhny. The next day, he signed with Spanish club Real Betis Energía Plus for the rest of the 2016–17 ACB season.

2017–18 season
On July 24, 2017, Kane signed with Israeli club Maccabi Tel Aviv for the 2017–18 season. On March 22, 2018, Kane recorded a season-high 19 points, shooting 7-of-9 from the field, along with nine rebounds, five assists, and three steals in a 75–76 loss to Panathinaikos. Kane went on to win the 2017 Israeli League Cup and the 2018 Israeli League Championship titles with Maccabi.

2018–19 season
On July 8, 2018, Kane signed a one-year contract extension with Maccabi. Kane won the 2019 Israeli League Championship with Maccabi, winning his second straight Israeli League title in the process.

2019–20 season
On February 5, 2020, Kane signed with the Serbian team Mega Bemax of the ABA League. Two days later, he made a debut for Mega in a 87–76 win over Cibona, recording 14 points, 5 rebounds and 3 assists. On February 8, Kane parted ways with Mega to join the Greek BCL side Peristeri for the rest of the season.

The Basketball Tournament
Kane was a member of Overseas Elite, a professional team competing in The Basketball Tournament (TBT), a winner-take-all single-elimination tournament. In TBT 2016, Kane averaged 9.2 PPG and 4.0 RPG as Overseas Elite took home the $2 million prize. In TBT 2017, Kane averaged 9.3 PPG and 3.3 RPG as Overseas Elite successfully defended their title, defeating Team Challenge ALS in the championship game, 86–83. In TBT 2018, Kane averaged 6.0 PPG and 3.3 RPG on 54 percent shooting. Overseas Elite reached the championship game and defeated Eberlein Drive, 70–58, again claiming the $2 million prize. In TBT 2019, Kane and Overseas Elite advanced to the semifinals where they suffered their first-ever defeat, losing to Carmen's Crew, 71–66. Kane did not play for Overseas Elite during TBT 2020; the team lost in the semifinals.

For TBT 2021, with Overseas Elite not entering the tournament, Kane joined Boeheim's Army, a team rostered primarily with Syracuse Orange men's basketball alumni. Boeheim's Army captured the championship and $1 million prize.

Personal life
On June 1, 2017, Kane became a Hungarian dual citizen.

Career statistics

EuroLeague

|-
| style="text-align:left;"| 2017–18
| style="text-align:left;"| Maccabi
| 30 || 18 || 23.3 || .511 || .289 || .515 || 4.0 || 2.1 || .9 || .3 || 7.4 || 9.8
|-
| style="text-align:left;"| 2018–19
| style="text-align:left;"| Maccabi
| 25 || 24 || 25.7 || .433 || .310 || .407 || 3.8 || 2.6 || 1.1 || .1 || 8.0 || 8.6
|-
|- class="sortbottom"
| style="text-align:left;"| Career
| style="text-align:left;"|
| 55 || 42 || 24.3 || .471 || .303 || .467 || 3.9 || 2.3 || 1.0 || .2 || 7.7 || 9.2

College statistics

|-
| style="text-align:left;"| 2010–11
| style="text-align:left;"| Marshall
| 34 || 34 || 31.6 || .428 || .318 || .633 || 5.6 || 3.4 || .9 || .1 || 15.1
|-
| style="text-align:left;"| 2011–12
| style="text-align:left;"| Marshall
| 34 || 33 || 34 || .414 || .250 || .599 || 5.4 || 3.5 || 1.4 || .3 || 16.5
|-
| style="text-align:left;"| 2012–13
| style="text-align:left;"| Marshall
| 28 || 25 || 37.1 || .403 || .248 || .521 || 4.4 || 7.0 || 1.8 || .2 || 15.1
|-
| style="text-align:left;"| 2013–14
| style="text-align:left;"| Iowa State
| 36 || 36 || 34.4 || .483 || .398 || .635 || 6.8 || 5.9 || 1.2 || .3 || 17.1
|-
|- class="sortbottom"
| style="text-align:center;" colspan="2"| Career
| 132 || 128 || 34.2 || .432 || .301 || .602 || 5.6 || 4.9 || 1.3 || .2 || 16.0

Source: Sports-Reference

References

External links
 RealGM profile
 FIBA.com profile
 Iowa State bio
 Marshall bio

1989 births
Living people
ABA League players
All-American college men's basketball players
American expatriate basketball people in Belgium
American expatriate basketball people in Germany
American expatriate basketball people in Israel
American expatriate basketball people in Russia
American expatriate basketball people in Serbia
American expatriate basketball people in Spain
American men's basketball players
Antwerp Giants players
Basketball players from Pittsburgh
BC Krasny Oktyabr players
BC Nizhny Novgorod players
Real Betis Baloncesto players
Hapoel Eilat basketball players
Hungarian men's basketball players
Iowa State Cyclones men's basketball players
KK Mega Basket players
Liga ACB players
Maccabi Tel Aviv B.C. players
Peristeri B.C. players
Marshall Thundering Herd men's basketball players
Ratiopharm Ulm players
Schenley High School alumni
Shooting guards
Small forwards